Tinted photograph is a  photograph produced on dyed printing papers produced by commercial manufacturers or a hand-colored photograph. A single overall colour underlies the images printed on dyed photographic papers and is most apparent in the highlights and mid-tones. From the 1870s albumen printing papers were available in pale pink or blue and from the 1890s gelatin silver printing-out papers in pale mauve or pink were available. There were other kinds of tinted papers. Over time such colouration often becomes very faded.The paper is also used to highlight the important thing or part on it.

Other meanings
Tinted photograph is also one of a number of names for a hand-colored photograph, i.e. a black-and-white photographic print to which color has been added by hand. Other names are hand-painted photograph and hand-tinted photograph.

See also
Photochrom
Hand-colouring

Notes

References
 Baldwin, Gordon. Looking at Photographs: A Guide to Technical Terms (Malibu, Calif.: The J. Paul Getty Museum in association with the British Museum Press, London, 1991), 7, 35, 55, 80, 81–82.
 Vintage B&W photographs hand color tinted to create new vibrant images of an era gone past. My Vintage Photos features images of Movie & Cultural Celebrities, Native American Indians, Civil War & Military, Famous Places & Landmarks, US Presidents & Political Figures, Scientists and Heroes & Outlaws of the American Old West.

Photographic techniques